Hale's Ales was a brewery in Seattle, Washington, USA, founded in 1983.

History
It was founded by Mike Hale in 1983. The first batch was brewed in a Colville, Washington apartment before the brewery opened in a local warehouse. Its second brewery opened four years later in Kirkland, Washington. The Colville brewery moved to Spokane, Washington, in 1992, and the Kirkland brewery to Seattle's Ballard neighborhood in 1995. The Ballard location was a 30-barrel brewpub.

Brews
The Hale's Ales brewing process followed a traditional English style, utilizing open fermentation tanks with top-fermenting ale yeast. Most recipes called for a proprietary English yeast strain, however Belgian strains have been used in some seasonal recipes. Hale's Ales had also begun experimenting with bourbon barrel-aging certain recipes including the Wee Heavy Winter Ale, Troll Porter, as well as Supergoose IPA.

Brewed Year Round
 Pale American Ale
 Kölsch German Style Ale
 Mongoose IPA
 Red Menace Big Amber
 El Jefe Weizen
 Cream Ale
 Cream H.S.B (Hale's Special Bitter)
 Troll Porter
 Nightroll Porter
 Supergoose IPA

Brewed Seasonally
 Wee Heavy Winter Ale
 Irish Style Nut Brown Ale
 O'Brian's Harvest Ale
 Rudyard's Rare Barley Wine
 Aftermath Imperial I.P.A.
 Pikop Andropov's Rushin' Imperial Stout
 Belgian Dubbel 25th Anniversary Ale

The Palladium
What was once a brewery warehouse is now a versatile space which is home to the theatrical Moisture Festival production, weddings, company parties, dance, cabaret, and other events. 
This large space is equipped with stage lighting, sound equipment, concession stand, a green room, and atmosphere galore.

Notes

References

External links
Hale's Ales

Food and drink companies based in Seattle
Manufacturing companies based in Seattle
Beer brewing companies based in Washington (state)
American beer brands